Talkin' 'Bout Your Generation is an Australian game show produced by Granada Productions which premiered on Network Ten on 5 May 2009. It is hosted by Shaun Micallef.

History

Original run

The first series ran on Network Ten for 18 episodes, with the original production order extended due to the success of the show.

A second series of 26 episodes began airing from 7 February 2010. Series 2 had a planned hiatus after episode 10 on 18 April 2010 and returned to finish its run on 1 August 2010.

The third series of the show began on 8 February 2011.

On 27 October 2011, Talkin' 'Bout Your Generation was renewed for a fourth series. On 22 January 2012, it was announced that the show would begin airing Series 4 on 1 February 2012 in an 8 pm timeslot.

Revival
In September 2017, it was announced that the show would be revived on the Nine Network for 8 episodes with Micallef returning as host. In October 2017, the series was officially confirmed for revival set to air in 2018, as well as the announcement of the series captains. Generation X was led by Robyn Butler, Generation Y was led by Andy Lee and Generation Z was led by Laurence Boxhall. It has a new set and it also changed its graphics including new logo and as well as fonts, sets and theme song and primary colours. The primary colours are red (Generation X), yellow (Generation Y) and blue (Generation Z). The show was once again filmed at Docklands Studios in Melbourne. It is recorded in front of a live audience of 500 people.

In October 2018, the series was renewed for a sixth season at Nine's upfronts with Micallef returning as host and Lee, Butler & Boxhall returning as series captains. The series premiered on 1 May 2019.

After the series
Nine has not renewed Talkin' 'Bout Your Generation and is yet to announce any Hamish & Andy project, as Andy Lee has joined the team in Seven Network's The Front Bar from 2020.

Format
Talkin' 'Bout Your Generation (also known as TAYG) is an hour-long quiz show testing the popular culture knowledge of teams from three different cultural generations. The first run generation team captains are Amanda Keller (Baby Boomers), Charlie Pickering (Generation X) and Josh Thomas (Generation Y). The second run generation team captains are Robyn Butler (Generation X), Andy Lee (Generation Y) and Laurence Boxhall (Generation Z). Each team captain is joined by a different guest each episode who is part of their respective generations. However, on occasion there have been guests not actually part of the generation they represent on the show. (For example, Ian Smith and George Negus have featured as Baby Boomers but are actually members of the Silent Generation.) For the original run, the guests up to 30 are placed in the Generation Y team, guests aged 30–45 in the Generation X team and guests aged 45 and over in the Baby Boomer team. During the second run, guests up to 25 are placed in the Generation Z team, guests aged 25–40 in the Generation Y team and guests aged 40–55 in the Generation X team.

Typically, each episode features six rounds with the three teams competing in various themed games which feature wordplay-based names such as What's A Doodle Doo?, Name That Tee and ¡chronoloco!. One point is awarded for each correct answer, though in practice points can be awarded or deducted at Shaun's own discretion. The first three rounds involve the contestants buzzing in first to give their answer. Games played in these rounds can involve identifying missing television characters from a cast picture, identifying a company name from a partially constructed logo, or identifying a catchphrase and its origin from a T-shirt.

The fourth round sees teams choosing from four categories from the main display (dubbed the "magic window"), and often involves their participation on the studio floor on their part. Games include matching up celebrity pairs (such as famous mothers and daughters) on the screen, ransacking a period setting to identify anachronistic items, and performing charades. From 2018, it was used in the third round.

The fifth round, called "Your Generation" and later Yo-Gen, sees all teams quizzed in turn on themed questions relevant to their particular generation and based on a certain topic or Yo-Gen Subject. In this round, one point is awarded for each correct answer and two points are lost with each incorrect answer. In 2018, the fourth round was used. In 2019, it was part of the magic window.

The final round, called End Game, sees all teams trying to complete a physical task, usually to be judged by Shaun. The number of points up for grabs in this round is usually determined by the number of points that separate the first and third placed teams at this stage of the game; therefore the winner of the End Game is the winner of the episode.

The winning team is presented with a secondhand trophy donated by Shaun (first series), viewers (third, fourth and fifth series), as a vanity prize. During the second series, a specially made TAYG trophy was presented to the winning team; the trophy featured three people (representing the three generations playing) raising a flag pole with a TAYG flag on top. In series 6, Pete Smith provide the voiceover with the winning prize and an announcer sign-off at the end of the show, for example "This is Pete Smith speaking.".

Team captains

Original series
Amanda Keller (Baby Boomers, 2009–2012)
Charlie Pickering (Generation X, 2009–2012)
Josh Thomas (Generation Y, 2009–2012)

Revived series
Robyn Butler (Generation X, 2018–19)
Andy Lee (Generation Y, 2018–19)
Laurence Boxhall (Generation Z, 2018–19)

List of games

Original series

These are some of the games that are featured in the show from 2009 to 2012. Not all of them are mentioned.
 As Quick As
 Befuddled
 Chicken or Egg? (Originally called What Came First?)
 Chinese Internet
 Fadtastic
 Franken-Face
 Gen Modified
 Human Fly
 Name That Tee
 Pandamonium
 Partners in Primetime
 Poli-waffle
 Slogan's Run
 Sounds Like History
 Spoilers Ahoy
 What's a Doodle Doo?
 What Just Happened?
 Who Am I Doing?
 Who Goes There?
 Who Wears What?
 Whosebook
 You've Got Tagged
 You Say Various Things

Games featured in the Magic Window:
The Magic Window is the large screen in the background of the TAYG set. The teams pick one of four buttons from the window which are labelled with the genres (Art, Brands, Celebrities, Film & TV, Language, Leisure, Lifestyle, Music, News & Current Affairs and Sport) of the game that is featured in that button and later, things or people relating to a certain subject. Trust Me was in one of the buttons.
 All The Right Moves
 ¡chronoloco!
 Draw That...
 Era Error
 Name That Tune
 Third Drawer Down
 HG Wells' Time Machine
 Watch Your Mouth
 Who Said That?

Revived series

These are some of the games that are featured in the show from 2018 to 2019. Not all of them are mentioned. New games are in bold.
 As Quick As
 Befuddled
 Chicken or Egg?
 Chinese Internet
 Franken-Face
 Human Fly
 Logo A Go Go
 Merch of Time
 Objectification
 Pandamonium
 Poli-waffle
 Slogan's Run
 Sounds Like History
 Spoilers Ahoy
 What's App, Doc?

Games featured in the Magic Window:
The Magic Window is the large screen in the background of the TAYG set. The teams pick one of four buttons from the window which are labelled with the genre of game that is featured in that button and later, things or people relating to a certain subject. New games are in bold. Who Am I Doing? and What Just Happened now appeared on the Magic Window was included.
 Add & Distract
 Alien Autopsy
 Anachronistuck
 Beat the Boomer, Baby
 ¡chronoloco!
 Draw That...
 Lip Reading
 Meals on Heels
 Name That Tune
 Time Machine
 Trust Me
 Watch Your Mouth
 What Art Thou?
 What Just Happened?
 Who Am I Doing?

Episodes

The first series began airing on 5 May 2009. It ran for 18 episodes concluding with a Christmas special on 22 November 2009. Due to the popularity of the first series, a second series was commissioned and began airing on 7 February 2010. The series aired for 10 episodes and took a three-month break before resuming on 1 August 2010. The series then ran for a further 16 episodes, totalling 26 for the second series. Also, a highlights episode, dubbed 'family assortment', was aired on 4 April 2010. A third series of the show began broadcast on 8 February 2011. Similar to the second series, the third series was split into two distinct blocks for broadcast. It concluded on 18 September 2011.

Reception

Ratings
The first series of the show, which aired at 7:30 pm Tuesday night, was very successful ratings-wise with the show considered a surprise hit. The premiere episode of the show debuted with an average of 1,648,000 viewers, coming in first for the night and fourth for the week. The subsequent episode drew in 1,599,000 viewers, coming both first for the night and the week. The highest rating episode was the eighth, which averaged 1,754,000 viewers. The 2009 Christmas special aired at a 6:30 pm Sunday night timeslot. In comparison, it drew in only 1,060,000 viewers.

The second series of the show debuted in the 7:30 pm Sunday night timeslot, with the series premiere drawing in 1,323,000 viewers. After sixteen episodes the show returned to the 7:30 pm Tuesday night slot to make way for the broadcast of Junior MasterChef Australia on Sunday nights. The ratings figures for the second season were generally behind the high figures set during the first series. The season finale, which also doubled as the 2010 Christmas special, drew in 1,450,000 viewers.

Awards
The show was nominated for both the Most Popular and Most Outstanding Light Entertainment awards at the 2010 Logie Awards. In addition Shaun Micallef was nominated for both the Gold Logie and the Most Popular Presenter awards for his work on the show. The show won in both categories it was nominated for with Shaun Micallef winning the Logie for Most Popular Presenter alongside. He did not win the gold Logie. Team captains Josh Thomas and Charlie Pickering were also nominated for the Most Popular New Male Talent Logie.

Notes

References

External links

 
Network 10 original programming
Nine Network original programming
2000s Australian game shows
2010s Australian game shows
Australian television series revived after cancellation
Australian comedy television series
2009 Australian television series debuts
2012 Australian television series endings
2018 Australian television series debuts
2019 Australian television series endings
Australian panel games
English-language television shows
Television series by ITV Studios
Television shows set in Melbourne